SS Presidente Trujillo was a Dominican Cargo ship that was torpedoed by the German submarine U-156 in the Caribbean Sea off Fort-de-France, Martinique on 21 May 1942 while she was travelling from Fort-de-France, Martinique to San Juan, Puerto Rico carrying a cargo of beer, machinery and forage.

Construction 
Presidente Trujillo was built at the Howaldtswerke A. G. shipyard in Kiel, Germany in December 1900. Where she was launched and completed that same year. The ship could generate 204 n.h.p. with a speed of 11 knots. She was also armed with a 75mm deck gun and three AA machine guns.

Sinking 
Presidente Trujillo was travelling unescorted from Fort-de-France, Martinique to San Juan, Puerto Rico while carrying a general cargo of beer, machinery and forage when on 21 May 1942 at 18.29 pm, she was hit aft by a G7e torpedo from the German submarine U-156 in the Caribbean Sea off Fort-de-France, Martinique. The ship sank in four minutes and claimed the lives of 24 crewmen. The 15 survivors were rescued soon after.

Wreck 

References

1900 ships
Ships built in Kiel
Cargo ships
World War II shipwrecks in the Caribbean Sea
Ships sunk by German submarines in World War II
Maritime incidents in May 1942